"Snapshot" is a song written by Kye Fleming and Dennis Morgan, and recorded by American country music artist Sylvia.  It was released in May 1983 as the first single and title track from the album Snapshot.  The song reached #5 on the Billboard Hot Country Singles & Tracks chart.

Content
The song focuses on a woman who finds her lover cheating through a snapshot which "he doesn't know I've got" as he successfully covers all the evidence except for the photo, which she happens to find.

Chart performance

References

1983 singles
1983 songs
Sylvia (singer) songs
Songs written by Kye Fleming
Songs written by Dennis Morgan (songwriter)
Song recordings produced by Tom Collins (record producer)
RCA Records singles